Seismo Creek is a stream in North Slope Borough, Alaska, in the United States. It heads near Meat Mountain and flows to the Utukok River.

Seismo Creek was named in 1950 for nearby seismic operations.

See also
List of rivers of Alaska

References

Rivers of North Slope Borough, Alaska
Rivers of Alaska